was the sixty-first of the sixty-nine stations of the Nakasendō highway connecting Edo with Kyoto in Edo period Japan. It was located in the present-day city of Maibara, Shiga Prefecture, Japan.

History
Samegai-juku has a very long history, and was mentioned by name in the Nihon Shoki, which was completed in 720 AD, and in the even earlier Kojiki chronicle in connection with the Yamato Takeru mythology. It was located on the ancient Tōsandō highway connecting the capital of Heian-kyō with the provinces of eastern Japan, and continued to be mentioned in the diaries and the poems of travelers in the Heian and Kamakura periods. One of the main attractions of this station was the fresh and clear waters from the nearby Jizogawa river and many travelers thought of Samegai as a proper resting place.

In the early Edo period, the system of post stations on the Nakasendō was formalized by the Tokugawa shogunate in 1602, and it was a stopping place for traveling merchants who originated from Ōmi Province.  It was on the sankin-kōtai route by various western daimyō to-and-from the Shogun's court in Edo.  The station was also a transportation hub, as the Jizogawa river was navigable by small boats and barges, and was used to carry goods. Samegai-juku had seven warehouses (Tonyaba) lining its banks, far more than most other stations. 

Modern Samegai-juku
There are still ten buildings remaining from the Edo period today, giving visitors an idea of how the town looked hundreds of years ago. There is also an archives museum located in a Meiji period former post office which gives greater detail to the post town's past.

Samegai-juku in The Sixty-nine Stations of the Kiso Kaidō
Utagawa Hiroshige's ukiyo-e print of Samegai-juku dates from 1835 -1838. The print is dominated by a large pine tree in the center of the composition, with the thatched roofs of several buildings in the background. These buildings are the famous Rokken jaya of Samegai-juku, six hatago built for the purposes of housing the retinues which accompanied daimyō processions (while the lord himself stayed at the honjin). Two samurai retainers, one bearing a long spear, approach the buildings, while on the slope behind, four more have loads on their shoulders. The scene is observed by a seated farmer smoking a pipe, with the Hira Mountains in the background, beyond which is Lake Biwa.

Gallery

Neighboring post towns
Nakasendō
Kashiwabara-juku - Samegai-juku - Banba-juku

References

External links

Hiroshige Kiso-Kaido series
Takamiya-juku on Kiso Kaido Road
Maibara city home page

Notes

Stations of the Nakasendō
Stations of the Nakasendō in Shiga Prefecture
Ōmi Province
Maibara, Shiga